Onykia  robusta, also known as the robust clubhook squid and often cited by the older name Moroteuthis robusta, is a species of squid in the family Onychoteuthidae. The tentacular clubs are slender, containing 15–18 club hooks. Arms of the species contain 50–60 suckers, and grow to 90–100% of the mantle length. It is found primarily in the boreal to Temperate Northern Pacific.

Confusion with Architeuthis 

Some time before 1993, a large individual of O. robusta was photographed by Japanese diver Kubota H. in shallow water off southern Japan. In this image, the animal, which appears to be sick or dying, is shown with a diver, although the use of a wide-angle lens exaggerates its size. A video of the same squid appears in a Japanese made-for-television film. The image was published in the 1993 book European Seashells by Guido T. Poppe and Goto Yoshihiro, where it was identified as Architeuthis dux, the giant squid, and said to have been taken in the North Atlantic. If true, this image would represent the earliest known photograph of a live giant squid.

In The Search for the Giant Squid (1998), Richard Ellis wrote of this photograph:

"For a moment, I thought that some obscure photograph had captured the most elusive image in natural history. Fortunately for those who have devoted their lives to searching for Architeuthis, this was only an aberration, a case of mistaken identity."

More than a decade later, the first photographs of a true live giant squid in the wild were taken, on September 30, 2004.

See also 
 Cephalopod size

References 

 Chambers, S. 2008. It’s a sea monster! (Sort of). The World Link, June 3, 2008.
 Third-largest cephalopod. Siuslaw News, August 4, 2008.

External links 

Squid
Molluscs described in 1876
Molluscs of the Pacific Ocean